ForHousing formerly City West Housing Trust (CWHT) is a housing association in the City of Salford district. ForHousing is part of the Forviva Group with their head office in Eccles, Greater Manchester. Their homes were previously owned by Salford City Council until 2008 when they were stock transferred across to the new entity. ForHousing owns, and maintain over 14,600 homes. Colette McKune is the Group Chief Executive and Paul Kennedy is the chairman.

Area Served
In Eccles, Swinton, Irlam and Little Hulton, ForHousing have local housing offices that customers of ForHousing, or members of the public, call in to talk to members of staff. Their homes are in the Salford West area, including Eccles, Swinton, Walkden, Irlam and Cadishead.

Incidents
In November 2010, a gas explosion in properties on Merlin Road, Irlam, injured sixteen people.
In June 2016, a resident from Amblecote Gardens was taken to hospital, after falling from the second floor balcony of the sheltered housing accommodation.

References

Housing associations based in England
City of Salford